De Zwaan may refer to:

De Zwaan (restaurant), a Michelin starred restaurant in the Netherlands
De Zwaan (windmill), a Dutch windmill in Holland, Michigan
De Zwaan, Lienden, a windmill in Lienden, Netherlands

See also
Zwaan, a Dutch surname